State Highway 2 (SH 2) is a State Highway in Kerala, India that starts from Thiruvananthapuram Peroorkada and ends near Thenmala Kollam by joining with Kollam-Tirumangalam NH-744. The highway is 73.2 km long. The major towns in this highway are Nedumangad, Palode and Kulathupuzha. It is a major inter state highway road connecting Thiruvananthapuram the Capital City of Kerala to Shenkottai and Madurai in Tamil Nadu. In 2016 NHAI approved in principle this road as National highway.

Route description 
Peroorkada   > Karakulam >  Nedumangad   > Anad    >   Palode  >   Madathara   > Kulathupuzha  > Thenmala junction  -  joins with Kollam-Tirumangalam NH-744. 
This highway starts from Thiruvananthapuram corporation limits and ends at Thenmala junction kollam District. From Vellayambalam to vazhayila near Peroorkada in City limits, the highway is upgraded into a four-lane road with the part of Thiruvananthapuram City Road Improvement Project (TCRIP) Under Kerala Road Fund board. This stretch is one of the busiest roads in Trivandrum.

Future
In 2016 the state government announced the upgrading of Vazhayila to Nedumangad 12 km stretch into 21m four lane road. Government approved the project and land acquisition is going on. The remaining Nedumangad to Thenmala stretch is developing into standard two lane highway by PWD.

In 2017 the central government announced that the highway is approved in principal as National Highway as part of developing the road under Bharatmala scheme and is preparing Detailed Project Report through NHAI.

Main intersections

 Peroorkada-Thiruvananthapuram
Nedumangad - 11nth Stone Junction
SH 3 
Connecting Nedumangad - shorlarcode - Aruvaimozhi Tamilnadu.
Nedumangad - Pazhakutty junction
SH-47 Connecting Pazhakutty- Vembayam MC Road
Chullimanoor junction 
SH-45 Connecting Chullimanoor - Vithura - Ponmudi highway
Palode - Kushavoor junction 
Connecting SH-59 Hill Highway 
Palode - Peringamala- 
Vithura road
Madathara
SH-64 Connecting Madathara- Paripalli NH66 Road
Kulathupuzha
Connecting SH-59 Hill Highway
Kulathupuzha - Anchal road

See also 
Roads in Kerala
List of State Highways in Kerala

References 

State Highways in Kerala
Roads in Thiruvananthapuram district
Roads in Kollam district